A high-risk individual or high-risk person or high-risk population is a human being or beings living with an increased risk for severe illness due to age, medical condition, pregnancy/post-pregnant conditions, geographical location, or a combination of these risk factors.

High-risk people qualification 
High-risk people can be of any age. High-risk populations are vulnerable to serious illness. Globally, societal factors including limited access to healthcare and inadequate hygiene facilities can result in high-risk individuals. Access to proper healthcare is essential to the health and treatment of high-risk individuals, particularly high-risk mothers and infants. High-risk individuals can require long-term care.

In immunology, a person qualifies as a high-risk individual if their immune system is compromised or suppressed whether due to disease, cancer, chronic conditions, prescription medications, or recent surgical procedures. High-risk people are more susceptible to hospitalization and death from the Coronavirus disease 2019. The Centers for Disease Control and Prevention (CDC) recommends high-risk persons get the COVID-19 vaccine.

In psychiatry, a high-risk individual is a patient who engages in high-risk behaviors. In addiction treatment lexicon, a high-risk person refers to a person with a high likelihood of addiction and/or high likelihood of relapse.

Criteria for COVID-19 
Some factors that have been cited in the United States as defining high-risk individuals for suffering the more serious symptoms of COVID-19 include:

 Being 65 years of age or older 
 Being obese
 Living in a nursing home or long-term care facility 
 Being diabetic
 Being pregnant/post-pregnant
 Having chronic kidney disease or are undergoing dialysis
 Having lung diseases, including moderate to severe asthma
 Having serious heart conditions or hypertension
 Being immunocompromised
 Having sickle cell disease
 Having neurodevelopmental disorders such as cerebral palsy

See also 

 Health risk assessment
 Immune disorder
 Old age

References 

Medical classification
Risk factors